Sathi Savithri is a 1965 Indian Kannada-language film, directed by P. R. Kaundanya and produced by N. Vishweshwariah. The film stars Rajkumar, Udaykumar, Narasimharaju and K. S. Ashwath. The film has musical score by G. K. Venkatesh.

Cast

Rajkumar
Udaykumar
Narasimharaju
K. S. Ashwath
B. Raghavendra Rao
H. Ramachandra Shastry
Krishnakumari
B. Jayashree
Rukmini Devi
B. Jaya

Soundtrack

References

External links
 

1960s Kannada-language films
Films scored by G. K. Venkatesh
Films about Savitri and Satyavan
Films based on the Mahabharata